Sherman's fox squirrel (Sciurus niger shermani) is a subspecies of the fox squirrel. It lives in the U.S. states of Florida and Georgia in fire-prone areas of longleaf pine and wiregrass, especially around sandhills. A tree squirrel, Sherman's fox squirrel has lost much of its habitat to farming and development. This type of squirrel nests in oak trees using leaves and Spanish moss.

Description
In comparison to other fox squirrels, this subspecies is large (23 - 28 in. = 600 – 700 mm) with highly variable dorsal fur color ranging from nearly all black (uncommon) to silver, with variations of black over silver and silver over black. The underside is tan, while the head is generally black; the ears and muzzle are often white. The tail is long, nearly the length of the head and torso. Nests are usually in oak trees and are constructed of oak leaves and Spanish moss.

Taxonomy
"New analysis in 2014 and 2015 determined that the Sherman’s fox squirrel is not genetically distinct from other fox squirrels in north and central Florida making it appropriate to group all fox squirrels north of the Caloosahatchee River as Southern fox squirrels (Sciurus niger niger)." The Florida Fish and Wildlife Conservation Commission (FWC) specifically states that "The southern fox squirrel, previously classified as Sherman's fox squirrel, is a large rodent member of the Family Sciuridae." A 2017 FWC report states, “they [S. n. niger and S. n. shermani] may still deserve recognition as separate management units, based on morphological variations.”

The Georgia Department of Natural Resources, Wildlife Resource Division website states “The delineations between the ranges of the fox squirrel subspecies were originally determined by morphological measurements and pelage coloration.” They further clarify, “However, recent research has revealed no genetic structure in fox squirrels in North and Central Florida, indicating that S. n. niger, S. n. bachmani (Bachman’s fox squirrel), and S. n. shermani may not be genetically distinct subspecies. It is possible these subspecies should be identified and managed as a single subspecies, although they may still deserve recognition as separate management units, based on slight morphological variation. Another recent study found no evident genetic or ecological differences between S. n. niger and S. n. shermani in Georgia, though more investigation is needed to determine the validity of all subspecies of S. niger in Georgia and Florida.”

Conservation
Sherman's fox squirrel was once designated as a species of special concern in Florida but, due to their resiliency "to habitat modification" and their wider distribution as part of S. n. niger, the status was dropped.

The other fox squirrel subspecies in Florida is the mangrove or Big Cypress fox squirrel (Sciurus niger avicennia), which lives southwest of Lake Okeechobee.

References

Sciurus